Sinna Mapplai, also spelt Chinna Mappillai, is a 1993 Indian Tamil-language comedy film directed and co-written by Santhana Bharathi. The film stars Prabhu and Sukanya, with Radha Ravi, Anand, Sivaranjani and Visu in supporting roles. It was released on 14 January 1993. The film was remade in Telugu as Chinna Alludu (1993), in Kannada as Coolie Raja (1999) and twice in Hindi as Coolie No.1 (in 1995 and in 2020).

Plot 
Thangavel [Prabhu] is a coolie in a bus stand and a bachelor too. One day, he goes to look a bride for him in someone's house, there he was insulted as if he has been  working there in a bus stand for the small wages. On that day night, he comes feeling upset and notice the marriage broker Ambalavanan [Visu] whom he had helped before from the morons the other day was also sitting there. Then he is sharing the bad incident how it was happened and also was neglected in a bride's place. While he was explaining about the issue, later he knows that Ambalavanan was also insulted somewhere else by the Periya pannai Aalavandhan [Radha Ravi] for bringing up the lowest status groom for his Elder daughter and her name is Janaki [Sukanya]. He felt the groom is not equal to the periya pannai's highest status. After that incident of being insulted, he is sitting with upset face in a bus stand and also planning about to make a strong lesson for the Periya pannai, particularly about his arrogance should be controlled by someone. For the Consequences, Broker joins with Thangavel to make a plan like  pretending as a rich man who returns back from Singapore and also looking a bride, while he enters in her village, accidentally noticed janaki is also driving with Bullock Cart vehicle. So, 
he bets her that who would win in the drive in between his car or her cart. Finally, his car broke down while she went forward with her happy winning. Since that moment,he is falling in love with her to marry Janaki with lots of lying, plus wants to break her father's arrogance as per the Ambalavanan plans, and his money-minded thoughts too. Whereas, the days goes by, some day comes up when Periya Pannai came to the bus stand to pick up the other bus to visit his daughter in her house, suddenly his son in law is caught up by his eyesights felt like he was deceived by someone who works as a coolie (Porter) in a bus stand takes others luggages for the low wages, later, he ashamed in himself for being cheated and couldn't digest too. As soon as Thangavel was noticed by father in law, he gets alerted with striking out to make a sudden plan in tricky ways, that is,his father in law should have believed the person who he met is his younger brother. Both of his son in law and his brother is in no communication at all. After everything was explained, Everybody has trusted his words in the end of the conversation and rest of the story is told about How Thangavel maintain the lies in efficiently and overcomes these issue with ambalavanan supports, it has been  screenplayed in comical ways until the end of the movie part.

Cast 
 Prabhu as Thangavel
 Sukanya as Janaki
 Radha Ravi as Aalavandhan / Periya Pannai
 Anand as Vinod
 Sivaranjani as Mythili
 Visu as Ambalavanan
 Vinu Chakravarthy as Vinod's father
 Vennira Aadai Moorthy as an actor
 Mannangatti Subramaniam as kanakkupilli
 Kavithalayaa Krishnan

Soundtrack 
The soundtrack was composed by Ilaiyaraaja, with lyrics by Vaali, Gangai Amaran and Piraisoodan. The song "Vennilavu Kothipathanu" is set in Madhyamavati raga, and "Kadhorum Lolakku" is set in Natabhairavi.

Release and reception 
Sinna Mapplai was released on 14 January 1993. The Indian Express wrote, "[Sinna Mapplai] is a hilarious, racy comedy of the Wodehousian sort with engaging situations well directed by Santhana Bharathi". Kalki critic advised not to ask about the story, logic and other unnecessary things, but to put aside the old films that suddenly come to their mind. The critic added that Prabhu, Visu, Radha Ravi and others would make the audience laugh for two hours. At the 14th Cinema Express Awards, Crazy Mohan won the Best Dialogue Writer award.

Remakes 
The film was remade in Telugu as Chinna Alludu (1993), in Kannada as Coolie Raja (1999), and twice in Hindi with the title Coolie No. 1: in 1995 and in 2020.

References

Bibliography

External links 
 

1990s Tamil-language films
1993 films
Films directed by Santhana Bharathi
Films scored by Ilaiyaraaja
Films with screenplays by Crazy Mohan
Indian comedy films
Tamil films remade in other languages